DXKZ (91.5 FM) is a relay station of Davao-based Mango Radio, owned and operated by RT Broadcast Specialists. The station's transmitter is located in Zamboanga City.

The station was formerly known as Wild FM under UM Broadcasting Network. Back then, its studios were located at the 3rd Floor, SKT Bldg. along Rizal St. In 2016, Mango Radio, through RT Broadcast Specialists, acquired the station.

Mango Radio stations

References

Christian radio stations in the Philippines
Radio stations established in 2016
Radio stations in Zamboanga City